Augustus Legge (28 November 183915 March 1913) was Bishop of Lichfield from 1891 until 1913.

Family and education
Legge was the third son of William Legge, 4th Earl of Dartmouth, by his second wife Frances, daughter of George Barrington, 5th Viscount Barrington. William Legge, 5th Earl of Dartmouth, was his half-brother and Heneage Legge his full brother. He was educated at Eton and Christ Church, Oxford. He married Fanny Louisa, daughter of William Bruce Stopford Sackville, in 1877. They had several children. Fanny died in December 1911. Legge survived her by two years and died in March 1913, aged 73.

Career
Ordained in 1864, he served curacies at Handsworth, Staffordshire (1864–1866) — where his family owned land — and afterwards at St Mary's, Bryanston Square (1866–1867). His brother (by then Earl of Dartmouth, and patron of the church) presented him to become Vicar of St Bartholomew's, Sydenham (1867–1879); he became additionally domestic chaplain to Anthony Thorold, Bishop of Rochester, and an honorary canon of Rochester Cathedral (1877–1891); he succeeded his uncle (Henry Legge) as Vicar of St Mary's, Lewisham (1879–1891) — where his brother was lord of the manor; and served additionally as Rural Dean of Greenwich (1880–1886); and of Lewisham (1886–1891) before his appointment to the episcopate: his election to the See of Lichfield was confirmed at St Mary-le-Bow on 28 September and he was consecrated a bishop at St Paul's Cathedral on 29 September 1891, by Edward Benson, Archbishop of Canterbury. From 1873 to 1876 he was a member of the London School Board, representing the Greenwich Division.

References

1839 births
1913 deaths
People educated at Eton College
Alumni of Christ Church, Oxford
Bishops of Lichfield
19th-century Church of England bishops
20th-century Church of England bishops
Younger sons of earls
Augustus
Members of the London School Board